Susques is a department of the province of Jujuy (Argentina).

References 

Departments of Jujuy Province